The Sunday Times is a tabloid Sunday newspaper published by Western Press Pty Ltd, a subsidiary of Seven West Media, in Perth and distributed throughout Western Australia. Founded as The West Australian Sunday Times, it was renamed The Sunday Times from 30 March 1902. 

Owned since 1955 by Rupert Murdoch's News Corp Australia and corporate predecessors, the newspaper and its website PerthNow, were sold to Seven West Media in 2016.

History
A subsequent government inquiry found no justification for Vosper's campaign against O'Connor.

The paper was purchased from Vosper's estate by James MacCallum Smith and Arthur Reid in 1901. In 1912, MacCallum Smith became sole proprietor and managing director, remaining in that role until 1935, as well as being a member of the Western Australian Legislative Assembly for 20 years. A. T. Chandler succeeded J. E. Webb as editor around 1920, and was an effective promoter of MacCallum Smith's secessionist views.

In 1935, a syndicate led by Jack Simons and including Victor Courtney and mining entrepreneur Claude de Bernales purchased Western Press Limited, the publisher of the paper, for £55,000.  Simons was chairman and managing director until his death in 1949 when Courtney took control. In 1955 Courtney sold Western Press to Rupert Murdoch's News Limited.

The 2016 sale to Kerry Stokes's Seven West Media was not opposed by the Australian Competition and Consumer Commission and included certain co-operative arrangements, including sharing of news content between SWM and News Corp, which will also handle Sunday Times and PerthNow advertising sales in Australia's eastern states. The two companies were already partners in Western Australia's Community Newspaper Group. Under the sale agreement, printing and distribution of those 17 local papers and W.A. circulation of The Australian will be done by SWN's West Australian Newspapers.

Format and circulation
To counter decreasing demand for newspapers and competition from radio, television and internet news, The Sunday Times has made adaptations in style and presentation. Its statewide circulation and extensive advertising content make it probably the most profitable newspaper in Australia.

The paper's stated audited circulation was 282,585 in 2011, 257,330 in March 2013, and 184,012 in March 2016.

In June 2006, The Sunday Times launched  PerthNow, an online presentation of local news from News Limited. , third-party web analytics provider Alexa, ranked Perthnow.com.au as the 233rd most visited website in Australia, while SimilarWeb rated the site as the 32nd most visited news website in Australia.

Editors
Recent editors have been Don Smith from 1987, Brian Crisp from 1999, Brett McCarthy from 2001, Sam Weir from June 2007, Christopher Dore from April 2012 and Rod Savage from June 2013. In November 2016, The position devolved to Michael Beach, a Walkley-Award-winning journalist and SWM senior editor. The position was made obsolete in April 2020. (https://mumbrella.com.au/swm-makes-the-sunday-times-editor-role-redundant-in-response-to-covid-19-impacts-624138)

Competition-free status
Western Australia's diminutive population has not enjoyed a competitive Sunday newspaper since The Independent was bought out by News Limited in 1984 and wound up in May 1986.

Before 1990, Perth had competitive Saturday newspapers (Weekend News and Western Mail (1980–1988)), as well as weekday morning and afternoon dailies (The West Australian and Daily News respectively).  A small-circulation state edition of Murdoch's national daily The Australian is printed at The Sunday Times, targeting an elite readership group in a way which does not seriously impinge on the more demotic audience of The West Australian.

A joint venture between the two companies produced many suburban papers under the Community Newspapers banner until Seven West Media bought the remaining stake in 2019 (https://www.abc.net.au/news/2019-05-27/seven-west-media-buys-remaining-stake-in-community-newspapers/11153572). The Community masthead was retired in 2020 (https://www.perthnow.com.au/news/perth/seven-west-media-to-retire-community-newspaper-group-brand-relaunching-as-free-perthnow-newspapers-ng-b881912202z). Independents that are not produced by Seven West Media include Echo Newspapers, Examiner Newspapers, Herald Newspapers (with Perth Voice), and Post Newspapers.

2008 leak controversy
On 30 April 2008, members of the police fraud squad conducted a raid on the offices of The Sunday Times—an unusual event for Australian mainstream media—following a state government complaint that confidential cabinet information had been leaked to the paper. An upper-house select committee inquiry subsequently found that no direction had been given to police by any minister, parliamentarian or staffer; and that "the police over-reacted in what should have been a routine search". The committee's findings included criticism of the Western Australian Department of Premier and Cabinet and the Corruption and Crime Commission. It also recommended "that the Attorney General continue to pursue the introduction of shield laws for journalists".

See also 
 List of newspapers in Australia
 The West Australian

References

Further reading
 Dunn, Frank (1997) A Century of Sundays Perth, W.A. Sunday Times. 

Newspapers published in Perth, Western Australia
Weekly newspapers published in Australia
Sunday Times (Western Australia)
Seven Network